HD 29573 is a binary star system in the constellation Eridanus. It has a combined apparent visual magnitude of 4.99, making it visible to the naked eye. The system is moving further away from Earth with a heliocentric radial velocity of +3 km/s.

The binary nature of this system was discovered through observations made with the Hipparcos spacecraft. The pair orbit each other with a period of 41 years and an eccentricity of 0.8. The magnitude 5.19 primary component has a class of A1, 2.28 times the mass of the Sun, and is a suspected chemically peculiar star. The secondary has magnitude 7.22, 1.56 times the Sun's mass, and a class of F2. The system has a possible infrared excess due to circumstellar dust.

References

A-type main-sequence stars
Eridanus (constellation)
Durchmusterung objects
Gliese and GJ objects
029573
021644
1483
Binary stars